Sardar Farooq Ahmed Tahir is a Pakistani politician and former deputy speaker and Law minister of the Azad Jammu and Kashmir Legislative Assembly. He belongs to PML-N.

References

Year of birth missing (living people)
Living people
Pakistan Muslim League (N) politicians
Place of birth missing (living people)